Do You Hear the Dogs Barking? (and also known as Ignacio) is a 1975 Mexican drama film directed by François Reichenbach. It was entered into the 1975 Cannes Film Festival.

The film is based on a short story, "¿No oyes ladrar los perros?", written by Juan Rulfo and collected in El Llano en llamas. The short story tells the tale of an old man carrying his wounded (criminal) son on his back in search of help. Meanwhile, he tells his son about what his future life will be like. The film intercuts between the story of the man and his child and the possible future of the child as a young indigenous man looking for work in Mexico City.

Cast
 Ahui Camacho as young Ignacio
 Aurora Clavel
 Ana De Sade
 Tamara Garina
 Salvador Gómez as adolescent Ignacio?
 Juan Ángel Martínez
 Gastón Melo
 Patrick Penn
 Salvador Sánchez as El Padre de Ignacio

Soundtrack

The film's score was composed, performed, and produced by Vangelis.

Track list
 Entends-tu les chiens aboyer ? Part 1 – 20:42 
 Entends-tu les chiens aboyer ? Part 2 – 17:45

References

External links

1975 films
1975 drama films
Mexican drama films
1970s Spanish-language films
Films directed by François Reichenbach
Films scored by Vangelis
1970s Mexican films